A Discourse on the Study of the Law is a treatise by Sir William Blackstone first published in 1758. On 20 October 1758 Blackstone had been confirmed as the first Vinerian Professor of English Law, and immediately gave a lecture on 24 October, which was reprinted as the Discourse. The Discourse was designed to be a work on how to study English law, and the importance of doing so. Blackstone emphasised the advantages of a civilian legal education over the training for a call to the Bar, arguing for the inherent dignity of study at a university. He was particularly alarmed by the growing practice of sending a potential lawyer to work in an attorney's office, saying that:  In Continental Europe and Scotland, the academic study of the law was regarded as a required part of a gentleman's training, but it was not in England; the aristocracy "have been more remarkably deficient than those of all Europe". This was because the "stylistic barbarisms and crafty practitioners" were seen as below the aristocracy, and not conforming to gentleman-like sensibilities. 

Blackstone also emphasised the need for gentlemen to study not only the law, but English law, to secure the continuation of the British tradition of civil liberties, arguing that "[W]e must not carry our veneration [of the civil law] so far as to sacrifice our Alfred and Edward to the manes of Theodosius and Justinian, we must not prefer the edict of the praetor, or the rescript of the roman emperor, to our own immemorial customs, or the sanctions of an english parliament; unless we can also prefer the despotic monarchy of Rome and Byzantium, for whose meridians the former were calculated, to the free constitution of Britain, which the latter are adapted to perpetuate". Described as a "sensible, spirited and manly exhortation to the study of the law", the initial print run of the Discourse sold out, necessitating the publication of another 1,000 copies. Later versions of his An Analysis of the Laws of England and the first volume of his Commentaries on the Laws of England were prefaced with copies. Paul Lucas, writing in the English Historical Review, notes that unlike his other works, Blackstone's Discourse survived its various editions with no modifications whatsoever, showing that he considered it "a key statement of his opinions".

References

Bibliography

Legal treatises
1758 in law
English law
1758 books